Tang Yunsheng (28 December 1903 – 13 March 1971) was a Peking opera singer.


Life
Tang was best known for his "old man" roles  lǎoshēng). He served as a mentor to Li Yuru.

References

Citations

Bibliography
 .

External links
 "唐韵笙" on Baike.com 

1903 births
1971 deaths
20th-century Chinese male singers
Chinese male Peking opera actors
Manchu male actors
Manchu singers
Male actors from Fuzhou
Musicians from Fuzhou
Singers from Fujian
20th-century Chinese male actors